Oidaematophorus balsamorrhizae is a moth of the family Pterophoridae first described by James Halliday McDunnough in 1939. It is found in western North America, including California, Alberta, British Columbia and Washington.

The forewings are light ochreous fawn, paling to ochreous in the second lobe. The fringes are of the same colour, but are mixed with light smoky. The hindwings are deep smoky with somewhat lighter fringes.

The larvae feed on Balsamorhiza species.

References

Moths described in 1939
Oidaematophorini
Endemic fauna of the United States
Moths of North America